Jensen Daniel Lewis (born May 16, 1984) is an American former Major League Baseball pitcher who played for the Cleveland Indians from 2007 to 2010 and is currently a baseball analyst with Bally Sports.

Career

Amateur
Lewis attended Vanderbilt University, and in 2003 and 2004 he played collegiate summer baseball with the Falmouth Commodores of the Cape Cod Baseball League, where he was named a league all-star in 2004.

Cleveland Indians
Jensen was selected 102nd overall at the 2005 MLB Draft. After spending the first half of the  season with Cleveland's minor league teams, the Akron Aeros and Buffalo Bisons, Lewis was called up to the Indians on July 13, and made his Major League Baseball debut against the Chicago White Sox three days later. Lewis would earn his first big league victory throwing three scoreless innings of relief against the Detroit Tigers on September 18. Lewis served as the Indians closer in August and September , converting all 13 of his save opportunities.

On July 20, 2010, Lewis was designated for assignment to make room for Asdrúbal Cabrera on the active roster. On July 21, Lewis was placed back on the 40-man roster and optioned to the Triple-A Columbus Clippers.

After a difficult 2011 spring training in which he allowed 10 runs on 13 hits in 5 2/3 innings, Lewis was outrighted to Columbus on March 22. He was released on June 24, after recording a 5.14 ERA in 28 innings while with Columbus.

Lewis signed a minor league contract with the Arizona Diamondbacks on November 29, 2011 and spent the 2012 season with the Reno Aces, the Diamondbacks' AAA affiliate. He signed a minor league contract with the Chicago Cubs in December 2012. The Cubs released Lewis in April 2013 after five games with the AAA Iowa Cubs, ending his professional career.

Sports analyst
In 2015 Lewis became the pregame/postgame analyst for the Cleveland Guardians games on SportsTime Ohio (now Bally Sports Great Lakes), and has three Lower Great Lakes Emmy Awards to his credit as part of the Guardians Live pregame/postgame show.

References

External links

1984 births
Living people
Major League Baseball pitchers
Baseball players from Cincinnati
Cleveland Indians players
Mahoning Valley Scrappers players
Akron Aeros players
Buffalo Bisons (minor league) players
Kinston Indians players
Columbus Clippers players
Reno Aces players
Iowa Cubs players
Falmouth Commodores players